is a passenger railway station  located in the town of  Inagawa, Hyōgo Prefecture, Japan. It is operated by the private transportation company Nose Electric Railway."Nissei" is named after Nippon Life Insurance Company.

Lines

Station layout
The station consists of one island platform and one side platform connected by an elevated station building.

Platforms

Adjacent stations

History
Nissei-chuo Station opened on 12 December 1978. It became an unstaffed station from 1 April 1991.

Passenger statistics
In fiscal 2019, the station was used by an average of 10,623 passengers daily

Surrounding area
 Nissay Newtown
Inagawa Town Hall

See also
List of railway stations in Japan

References

External links 

 Nissei-chuo official home page 

Railway stations in Hyōgo Prefecture
Railway stations in Japan opened in 1978
Stations of Nose Electric Railway